Ashley Colón, nicknamed La Chica Bomba (b. October 27, 1975, in Puerto Rico), is a Puerto Rican merengue singer.
Mostly influenced by popular Puerto Rican singer and actress Iris Chacón, Ashley began her successful career as a member of tropical band Las Chicas del Clan (The Girls of the Clan). Her debut as a solo artist came in 1997 with the release of the album Yo Soy la Bomba. The hit song "Yo Soy La Reina" from the album of the same name followed that same year. She performed with Elvis Crespo at the annual Tu Música awards ceremony. In 1999 Abrázame, meaning "hug me", became her international breakthrough, supported by a Latin American and U.S. tour. In 1999 she released a Tejano album called Sabor a dulce, followed by a greatest hits album in 2000 called Oro Merenguero. She also released El poder de las mujeres. Her most recent album, Estoy Loca, was released in 2003.

Ashley has charted on the Billboard Latin charts. She is nicknamed la chica bomba (the bomb girl).

Discography

References

1975 births
Living people
21st-century Puerto Rican women singers
Merengue musicians
20th-century Puerto Rican women singers
Women in Latin music